Carlos Enrique Estanislao Alegre Benavides (born 7 May 1924, date of death unknown) was a Peruvian basketball player. He competed in the men's tournament at the 1948 Summer Olympics.

References

External links
 

1924 births
Year of death missing
Peruvian men's basketball players
Olympic basketball players of Peru
Basketball players at the 1948 Summer Olympics
Place of death missing
People from Arequipa Province
1950 FIBA World Championship players
20th-century Peruvian people